Patent was launched at Lynn in 1803. During her career French privateers captured her twice, and the French Navy captured her once. Two of the captures took place in 1812. The British Royal Navy recaptured her twice, and her French Navy captors released her. She also captured but lost a valuable American ship. She was wrecked in 1819.

Career
Patent first appeared in Lloyd's Register (LR) in  1803. 

However the gun-brig HMS Sharp Shooter and the hired armed cutter Britannia recaptured Patent and sent her into Plymouth.

On 5 April 1808 Patent was among a handful of vessels in Margate Roads that lost their cables and anchors. Patent was on her way from Liverpool to London.

In January or February 1812 the French captured Patent, Gillespie, master.  recaptured Patent on 4 February. Patent arrived at Plymouth on 6 February. A fuller account from Plymouth dated 11 February reports that a French privateer had captured Patent, Smale late master, as she was returning from New Providence with logwood. The privateer took Smale and 10 of his crew off. Shortly thereafter Diana encountered Patent and chased her for three days before the french prize crew ran her aground on the French coast at low tide. At high tide the sailors from Diana were able to use casks to refloat Patent and work her out with little damage.

They captured numerous British and American vessels and burnt them all, except for Patent, M'Master, master, and Woodrup, Sims, master. They made a cartel of Patent, putting their British prisoners aboard her; she arrived at Plymouth on 24 May. The French put their American prisoners on Woodrop, which they sent to America. Returning to Lorient, the squadron met the British 74-gun ship-of-the-line , Captain Henry Hotham. In the ensuing action of 22 May 1812, the two frigates ran aground trying to escape their much stronger opponent. Their crews set their frigates afire to prevent the frigates's capture.

On 14 September, Patent was near Bermuda when her mate and a boat crew took possession of Hannibal, Hunt, master, which was sailing to America from Java. Hannibal was carrying a cargo of tea and other things, and $500,000. Patent arrived at Portsmouth from Jamaica, but Hannibal made her escape. Patent detained and brought into Portsmouth the supercargo, mate, and boat crew from Hannibal that had come aboard Patent for provisions.

Fate
Patent, Ward, master, was driven ashore on 17 October 1819 and severely damaged on the coast of Lincolnshire. She had nine feet of water in her hold and had to discharge her cargo. She was on a voyage from Riga to Hull. A gale on 21 October totally wrecked her.

Notes and citations
Notes

Citations

1803 ships
Age of Sail merchant ships of England
Captured ships
Maritime incidents in 1819